Wiedemann Language Award (full name The State F. J. Wiedemann Language Award) is an Estonian state award which is granted each year to one natural person for outstanding merits upon study, organisation, teaching, promotion or use of the Estonian language.

Recipients
1989 – Henn Saari
1990 – Hella Keem, Erich Raiet
1991 – Pent Nurmekund
1992 – Rein Kull, Valev Uibopuu
1993 – Rudolf Karelson, Uno Liivaku
1994 – Nikolai Baturin, Paul Saagpakk
1995 – Lennart Meri
1996 – Juhan Peegel
1997 – Eduard Leppik
1998 – Mari Must, Huno Rätsep
1999 – Tiiu Erelt, Uno Mereste
2000 – Ellen Uuspõld
2001 – Ülle Viks, Eduard Vääri
2002 – Valdek Pall
2003 – Mati Hint, Helju Vals
2004 – Viivi Maanso
2005 – Haldur Õim
2006 – Heldur Niit
2007 – Kristiina Ross
2008 – Mati Erelt
2009 – Ilse Lehiste
2010 – Ain Kaalep
2011 – Tiit-Rein Viitso 
2012 – Mari Tarand
2013 – Valve-Liivi Kingisepp
2014 – Arvo Krikmann
2015 – Leelo Tungal
2016 – Uno Laur
2017 – Marja Kallasmaa
2018 – Reet Kasik
2019 – 
2020 – Helle Metslang
2021 – Jüri Viikberg
2022 – Mare Koit

References

Estonian language
Estonian awards
Language-related awards